Malibu Locals Only (MLO) is a group of youths local to Malibu, California, who have been associated with several violent attacks along with other criminal activity in the city.  Frequently involved with party, bar or beach area fights, the group has maintained a feeling of aversion toward residents of the San Fernando Valley region, as well as other outsiders who find their way into Malibu for recreation or leisure. Currently, they are considered to be an unorganized group of an estimated 10 to 15 people, who are often criticized by former MLO members for their attacks on innocent people, rather than operating on the original goals of the organization.

Origins 
Initially established in the 1960s by a group of Malibu surfers, the group sought to do two things; stop the San Fernando Valley surfers from using their beaches  (which, at the time, were private), and protect students of Malibu who were the minority in high schools at the time (because Malibu High School had not yet been constructed). The group began to graffiti the letters "MLO", which eventually became the name by which the group was referenced, and Malibu Locals Only was born.

Current activity 
Today, the gang has been responsible for multiple instances of brutality. The gang has also been involved in many encounters with Pepperdine University students, frequently at the Malibu Inn.

See also
Lunada Bay Boys

References

External links
Brian William Ludeke, "Malibu Locals Only: "Boys Will Be Boys", Or Dangerous Street Gang? Why the Criminal Justice System's Failure to Properly Identify Suburban Gangs Hurts Efforts at Fighting Gangs" (August 6, 2006). bepress Legal Series. Working Paper 1502.
Meet SOCAL'S Low-profile, High-income Surf Game

Street gangs
Gangs in California
Malibu, California